Harmaclona are a genus of moths, belonging to the family Tineidae. The genus was described by August Busck in 1914.

Species
Harmaclona afrotephrantha Davis, 1998
Harmaclona berberea Bradley, 1956
Harmaclona cossidella Busck, 1914
Harmaclona hexacantha Davis, 1998
Harmaclona hilethera Bradley, 1953
Harmaclona malgassica Bradley, 1956
Harmaclona natalensis Bradley, 1953
Harmaclona robinsoni Davis, 1998
Harmaclona tephrantha (Meyrick, 1916)
Harmaclona triacantha Davis, 1998

References

Harmacloninae
Tineidae genera
Taxa named by August Busck